Zimmerling is a German surname. Notable people with the surname include:

Jürgen Zimmerling (1952–2005), German politician
Matthias Zimmerling (born 1967), German footballer and manager

German-language surnames